The Parliamentary Under-Secretary of State for Local Government and Building Safety is a mid-level position in the Department for Levelling Up, Housing and Communities in the British government. The incumbent minister is Lee Rowley. The position was last held by Paul Scully, who was appointed after the resignation of Kemi Badenoch MP during the July 2022 government crisis.

Responsibilities
Minister's Responsibilities include:

Local government policy and finance, including Office for Local Government (Oflog)
Building Safety - remediation and regulation regimes
Climate change, net zero and energy efficiency (building regulations)
Grenfell recovery and rehousing
Grenfell public inquiry
Minister for London

Ministers

Notes

References

Department for Levelling Up, Housing and Communities
Housing ministers of the United Kingdom